The Nottinghamshire Archives holds the archives for the county of Nottinghamshire. The archives are held at Castle Meadow Road, Nottingham, and run by Nottinghamshire County Council.

Collections 
The collections held by Nottinghamshire Archives are organised as follows:

Source: "Archives: Collections and Catalogues", Nottingham County Council. Retrieved 18 September 2016.

Archivists 

In 1939, Nottingham Corporation appointed Violet Walker the first City Archivist; she had been appointed a librarian at Radford in 1926, before moving to Nottingham Reference Library in 1928, where she became librarian in 1936 and oversaw the re-cataloguing of its stock using the Dewey decimal system. While City Archivist, Walker's translation of the Newstead Cartulary was published. She retired in 1966 and her assistant of two years, Adrian Henstock, took over the post. When the City and County Archives merged in 1974, Henstock became Principal Archivist and served in that post until he retired in 2003. Mark Dorrington succeeded him, and remained in the post for 10 years, before becoming Keeper of Manuscripts and Special Collections, University of Nottingham in 2013. Ruth Imeson replaced him at the Archives as Team Manager, Archives and Local Studies, Nottinghamshire County Council, at the start of 2014.

References

Nottingham
History of Nottinghamshire
County record offices in England